The 1930 World Table Tennis Championships women's singles was the fourth edition of the women's singles championship.
Mária Mednyánszky met her compatriot Anna Sipos in the final of this event winning 21–18, 21–15, 21–23, 10–21, 21–15 to secure fourth consecutive title.

Draw

Finals

See also
List of World Table Tennis Championships medalists

References

-
World
Table